Paulino José Soares de Sousa, the Viscount of Uruguai (4 October 1808 – 15 July 1866), was a congressman, a senator, a State Councillor and a skilful diplomat.

Born in Paris, he distinguished himself during the 1850s when, as Minister of Foreign Affairs for Brazil, he organized the Brazilian Diplomatic Corps and structured the entire Brazilian policy of intervention in the River Plate against Juan Manuel de Rosas from Argentina, and Manuel Oribe from Uruguay.

A cautious diplomat, he knew how to take advantage of favourable circumstances, excluding unilateral action by Brazil and acting only at the request of the constitutional governments in the region. Success also came from his part in Franco-English involvement. He took on the financial burden incurred by France in maintaining the government of Montevideo and in relation to England, took steps towards the abolition of the slave traffic, creating favourable conditions for involvement by Brazil and its allies. In Paris in 1855 he negotiated the issue of Brazilian borders with French Guiana, which resulted in the matter being finally resolved in 1900, by the Baron of Rio Branco.

The Viscount died in Rio de Janeiro, aged 58.

1808 births
1866 deaths
Conservative Party (Brazil) politicians
Foreign ministers of Brazil
Finance Ministers of Brazil
Members of the Chamber of Deputies (Empire of Brazil)
Presidents of the Chamber of Deputies (Brazil)
Presidents of the Senate of the Empire of Brazil
Brazilian monarchists
Brazilian nobility
Ministers of Justice of Brazil